In England, the offices of mayor and lord mayor have long been ceremonial posts, with few or no duties attached to them. In recent years they have doubled as more influential political roles while retaining the ceremonial functions. A mayor's term of office denotes the municipal year.

Traditionally mayors and provosts have been elected by town, borough and city councils. Since 2000, several districts now have directly elected mayors with extensive powers. The role of the chair of a district council is exactly the same as the mayor of a borough council; they have the same status as first citizen, after the Sovereign, in their district, but they are not addressed as mayor.

Election
In England, where a borough or a city is a local government district or a civil parish, the mayor is elected annually by the council from their number and chairs meetings of the council with a casting vote. Where the mayoralty used to be associated with a local government district but that district has been abolished, charter trustees may be set up to provide continuity until a parish council may be set up. Where a parish council (whether the successor of a former borough or not) has resolved to style itself a town council, then its chair is entitled to the designation of town mayor, though in practice, the word "town" is often dropped.

Lord mayors

The right to appoint a lord mayor is a rare honour, even less frequently bestowed than city status.

Currently, 23 cities in England have lord mayors:
 Birmingham
 Bradford
 Bristol
 Canterbury
 Chester
 Coventry
 Exeter
 Kingston upon Hull
 Leeds
 Leicester
 Liverpool
 London
 Manchester
 Newcastle upon Tyne
 Norwich
 Nottingham
 Oxford
 Plymouth
 Portsmouth
 Sheffield
 Stoke-on-Trent
 City of Westminster
 York

In May 2022, Southampton was added to the list.

Honorifics
The Lord Mayors of London and York are styled The Right Honourable. All other Lord Mayors, as well as the Mayors of cities and the original Cinque Ports (Sandwich, Hythe, Dover, Romney and Hastings), are styled The Right Worshipful. (Bristol styles its lord mayor "Right Honourable" instead, but this usage is without official sanction.)<ref>The Title of Lord Mayor – Use of the Prefix "Right Honourable", The Times, 7 July 1932, p.16</ref> All other Mayors are styled The Worshipful'', though this is in practice seldom used for a Town Mayor. These honorific styles are used only before the Mayoral title and not before the name, and are not retained after the term of office.

A mayor can also be styled Mr Mayor and usually appoints a consort, usually a spouse, other family member or fellow councillor. In England (and the Commonwealth) the designated female consort of a mayor is usually styled Mayoress or occasionally Mrs Mayor and accompanies the mayor to civic functions. A female mayor is also called mayor, not, as sometimes erroneously called, "Lady Mayoress". A mayoress or Lady Mayoress is a female consort of a mayor or Lord Mayor; a male consort of a mayor or Lord Mayor is a Mayor's Consort or Lord Mayor's Consort.

See also
Local government in England
Municipal year
Lord Mayor of London
Combined Authority

References

External links
BBC article
New Local Government Network
English city and regional mayors 2017

Local government in the United Kingdom
Ceremonial officers in the United Kingdom